Archie Michael Sutton (November 2, 1941 – August 29, 2015) was an American professional football player who played offensive tackle for three seasons for the Minnesota Vikings.

Sutton found early fame as a tackle playing for the Illini alongside center, Dick Butkus; offensive guard, L.D. Stewart; and running back, Jim Grabowski. This powerhouse team defeated UCLA, Michigan, and (No. 4) Michigan State during the regular season. The Fighting Illini squad then topped Washington 17–7 in the 1964 Rose Bowl. He died in 2015.

References

1941 births
2015 deaths
Players of American football from New Orleans
American football offensive tackles
Illinois Fighting Illini football players
Minnesota Vikings players